Dmitry Yevgenievich Mezhevich (19 December 1940 in Moscow – 8 March 2017 in Moscow) was a  Soviet and Russian actor and songwriter.

Mezhevich worked in the Moscow Taganka Theatre, where he appeared in such productions as The Good Person of Szechwan, Hamlet, Woe from Wit, and Tartuffe. He studied oboe and eventually took up the guitar. Bulat Okudjava dedicated a song to him. In 2011, Mezhevich left Taganka Theatre.

References

External links
 Dmitry Mezhevich, Theatre of Taganka
 Biography

1940 births
2017 deaths
Soviet male actors
Russian male actors
Male actors from Moscow